is a 2014 Japanese animated musical film based on an anime television series with a same name co-created by Hajime Yatate and Bandai. The film is directed by Yuichiro Yano with Ryuichi Kimura as chief director, written by Yoichi Kato, and produced by Sunrise. The film was released in Japan on December 13, 2014.

The film focuses on Ichigo and the others preparing for "Ichigo Hoshiyama Super Live" event.

Plot
After performance at a live concert goes successful, the school headmistress, Orihime asks Ichigo and her friends backstage to hold a special live event: "Ichigo Hoshimiya Super Live". After the press conference, Akari decides that she wants to help Ichigo and the others for the event. Ichigo asks Naoto to write a song for her, but declines and suggest Kanon, a local singer and songwriter. Kanon agrees, and briefly bonds with the girls with a supreme strawberry parfait.

Later that night, Ichigo receives a message from Mizuki to meet her at a stadium, who surprisingly tells her that she'll stop being an idol. While disappointed, the girls continue to plan the event with help from others. As the three are practicing, Kanon comes and tells them that the song is ready. As Ichigo realizes that the song shouldn't be just for the fans, she hopes that it'll convince Mizuki to continue being an idol.

During the performance, Ichigo's crystal mic gets stolen by Swallow Thieves, which Shion helps it get it back in time. While Kaede, Sakura and Yurika manages to get the premium cards back in time, Akari also brings Mizuki in time, after searching for her in fourteen places. During Ichigo's performance, Akari tells Mizuki to join the performance, but she asks Akari to join with her. After the event, Mizuki tells Ichigo that she'll continue being an idol, and as a thank you gift, Ichigo gives Akari her crystal mic.

Voice cast

Sumire Morohoshi as Ichigo Hoshiyama
Ayaka Ohashi as Ran Shibuki
Azusa Tadokoro as Aoi Kiriya
Shino Shimoji as Akari Ōzora
Minako Kotobuki as Mizuki Kanazaki
Kiyono Yasuno as Sakura Kitaōji
Yuna Mimura as Kaede Ichinose
Yui Ishikawa as Hinaki Shinjō
Toshiyuki Toyonaga as Naoto Suzukawa
Ayumi Fujimura as Kanon
Kaya Matsutani as Headmistress Orihime Mitsuishi
Makoto Yasumura as Johnny Bepp

Production
On February 2014, it was announced that a first film for the Aikatsu! series was in development, with an original story focusing on the main three characters: Ichigo, Aoi and Ran.

Release
The film was released in theaters in Japan on December 13, 2014.

Reception

Box office
The film opened at number 5 out of top 10 in the Japanese box office in its opening weekend, and ranked number 1 on viewer statisfaction ratings on its first day.

Notes

References

External links

2010s Japanese films
2014 anime films
Aikatsu!
Sunrise (company)
Music in anime and manga
Anime films based on video games